Michał Szumski (born 10 September 1976) is a Polish former competitive ice dancer. With partner Iwona Filipowicz, he is the 1995 World Junior bronze medalist. Together they won gold medals at the 1995 Karl Schäfer Memorial, 1996 Golden Spin of Zagreb, and 1995 Grand Prix International St. Gervais, as well as silver at the 1995 Nebelhorn Trophy and two bronze medals at the Finlandia Trophy.

Programs 
(with Filipowicz)

Competitive highlights 
(with Filipowicz)

References 

1976 births
Polish male ice dancers
Living people
World Junior Figure Skating Championships medalists
Sportspeople from Łódź